Aimol, also known as Aimual, is a Sino-Tibetan language spoken by the Aimol people of Manipur, India. It is considered endangered and has less than 9,000 speakers worldwide as per 2011 census.

Geographical distribution
Aimol is spoken primarily in the Tengnoupal district, Chandel district, Kangpokpi district, and Churachandpur districts of Manipur. Aimol is spoken in the following villages of Manipur state (Ethnologue). There are also small numbers of speakers in Assam,Mizoram,Tripura,Nagaland.

Tengnoupal district: Aimol Khullen, Satu, Kumbirei, Chingunghut, Aimol Tampak, Khodamphai, Ngairong Aimol, Chandonpokpi, Sibong (Khudengthabi), and Khomayai (Khunjai)
Chandel district: Unapal 
Kangpokpi district: Tuikhang, Kharam Aimol
Churachandpur district: Luichungbum (Louchulbung), Kha-Aimol

Name
The name of the language comes from the Aimol tribe of people who speak it.  The word Aimol itself may come from the words Ai meaning "wild"  and Mol meaning "hill".

Genealogical affiliation 
Aimol is an Old Kuki language.  The language displays similar characteristics as other Old Kuki including Hmar, Kom, Koireng, Kharam, Purum, Chiru, Chothe, Tarao, etc.  However, most of the Old Kuki languages are not mutually intelligible with Aimol. Additionally, Aimol is reportedly less influenced by Meitei, the lingua franca of the state of Manipur, as compared to the other neighboring languages.
Aimol is mutually intelligible with Kom. Speakers of the respective languages can understand each other when speaking in their own language.  In terms of numeric structures, the two languages demonstrate extreme grammatical and structural similarities.
In the Linguistic Survey of India, Grierson reported that all the Old Kuki languages, including Aimol, are all merely dialects of the same language.  He also reported that these Old Kuki languages are closely related to the Central Kuki languages.

Dialects
The Langrong variety is distinct enough that some consider it a separate language. There are two dialects of Aimol proper, Sutpong and Khurai, which can perhaps be attributed to differing migration patterns.  There are small differences between the two but they are completely mutually intelligible.

Most occurrences of Aimol writing are of Sutpong.  This version makes use of glottal stops in word endings preceding by vowel sounds.  Speakers of this dialect tend to take pride in speaking this dialect over Khurai.

Khurai usually does not use the glottal stops as is present in Sutpong.  There is also less use of initial nasalized sounds in Khurai.  There may be negative interpretations of the word Khurai which lead to the negativity with the dialect.  Additionally, the Khurai dialect is understood to borrow more words from Meitei and other neighboring languages, though it is indisputable that both dialects take from and are influenced by other languages.

Writing system 
There are very few written records of the Aimol language.  Much of what has been recorded were samples from Grierson.  Younger generations use Latin script, while older generations use "Manipuri written in Bengali script."
Additionally, a version of the Bible has been recently completed and released. This should greatly benefit the translation and preservation process.

Syntax
Aimol follows the traditional subject-object-verb word order, like the other Tibeto-Burman languages, and uses postposition instead of preposition.  Tone is an important feature of the language, as the certain pitch used can indicate multiple different words.

Numerals
Cardinal numbers in Aimol are formed by using simple addition and/or multiplication compounds. The numbers between 11-19 are formed by taking the word for ten som and the respective number between 1–9, and using the connective word ləj. For example, the word for fifteen is som-ləj-raŋa, which is formed by the words for ten-connective-five. The decade, century, and thousand numbers are formed by using a multiplication compound. Finally, for the numbers not divisible by 10, the two principles are combined. The word for 22 is somniləjthum, which translate to ten-two-connective-two. In this instance, ten and two are multiplied to equal twenty which is connected to two.

Ordinal Numerals
Ordinal numerals are formed by adding the suffix cəŋnə to the base number.  For example, second is expressed as ənni-cəŋnə, meaning two-necessary suffix.

Multiplicative Numerals
Adding the prefix wəj- to a base numeral results in a multiplicative numeral.  Fifth is expressed by wəj-rəŋə, the prefix to the base word for 5.

Fractional Numerals
To express fractions, the prefix sem- is added to the denominator number, followed by the connective -ə-, and then the word for the numerator.  To express the fraction two-fifths, the word in Aimol is sem-rəŋə-ə-ənni.

Sociolinguistic background

Manipur
The linguistic situation of the state of Manipur is complex and confusing, making it difficult for proper classification and documentation of the dozens of endangered languages in the region.  Languages and dialects are classified according to status as a scheduled tribe.  Mutually intelligible dialects of the same language can be classified as distinct languages, and mutually unintelligible languages can be classified as dialects of the same language.
Additionally, there is difficulty attributed to shifting ethnic loyalties in the region.

Meitei
Meitei is the official language of Manipur and the lingua franca amongst the various tribes in the region.  Most Aimol speakers are completely fluent in Meitei.  Also, it is the language that is taught in school, thus Aimol has to be taught as a second language in the home.  The strong influence of the lingua franca is a considerable threat to the continued existence of Aimol and its survival in future generations.  However, there have been efforts to preserve the Aimol culture, including the language.  Additionally, Aimol sees a significant use in the personal domain.

Religion
The Aimol people are predominantly Christian and this community has helped with preserving the language.  The New Testament has been translated, and there are significant audio samples of the language in the form of Bible studies.  While primarily done to spread and maintain the religion, recordings like these are vital to the continued existence of the language.

See also
Aimol people
Kuki people
Tibeto-Burman languages
Linguistic Survey of India

References

Further reading
(2013, August 22). The Times of India:; Manipur sets up cell to develop state languages. Times of India, The (Mumbai, India) 
Bose, J.K. (1934). Social Organisation of the Aimol Kukis. Calcutta: Calcutta University Press.
Bradley, D. (1997). Tibeto-Burman languages and classification. Papers in Southeast Asian linguistics No.14, Tibeto-Burman languages of the Himalayas, 1-72. 
Bradley, D. (2012). The Characteristics of the Burmic Family of Tibeto-Burman. Language and Linguistics, 13, 171–192. 
Haokip, T. (2012). Revisiting English education amidst various local languages: situation in Manipur State. Language In India, (9). 404. 
Hodson, T.C. (1913). Note on the Numeral Systems of the Tibeto-Burman Dialects. Journal of the Royal Asiatic Society of Great Britain and Ireland, 315–336. 
Hyslop, G., Morey, S., & Post, M. (2011). North East Indian linguistics, 3. New Delhi: Foundation Books. 
Matisoff, J. (1995). Languages and dialects of Tibeto-Burman. Sino-Tibetan Etymological Dictionary and Thesaurus Project, Centers for South and Southeast Asia Studies, University of California, Berkeley. 
Needham, R. (1960). A Structural Analysis of Aimol Society.  Bijdragen tot de Taal-, Land- en Volkenkunde Deel 116, 1ste Afl., ANTHROPOLOGICA, 81-108. 
Pramodini, N. (2011). Sharing the Future: The Language Situation in Manipur. Language In India, 11(5), 404–421.

External links
 Aimol Profile at the Endangered Languages Project

Southern Naga languages
Endangered languages of India
Endangered Sino-Tibetan languages
Languages of Manipur
Languages of Assam